The Legend of the Condor Heroes is a 2008 Chinese television series adapted from Louis Cha's novel of the same title. The series was produced by Chinese Entertainment Shanghai, and stars Hu Ge, Ariel Lin, Justin Yuan and Cecilia Liu. The series was first broadcast on KMTV-1 in China in July 2008, This is the version with the most plot changes.

Cast

 Hu Ge as Guo Jing
 Ariel Lin as Huang Rong
 Justin Yuan as Yang Kang
 Cecilia Liu as Mu Nianci
 Wu Yujuan as Li Ping
 Ren Tianye as Guo Xiaotian
 Kathy Chow as Bao Xiruo
 Weng Jiaming as Yang Tiexin
 Guo Liang as Wanyan Honglie
 Anthony Wong as Huang Yaoshi
 Bryan Leung as Hong Qigong
 Elvis Tsui as Ouyang Feng
 Li Yu as Zhou Botong
 Xiao Rongsheng as Yideng
 Zhao Yi as Qiu Chuji
 Deng Limin as Ke Zhen'e
 Jin Liang as Zhu Cong
 Guo Ming'er as Han Baoju
 Han Zhi as Nan Xiren
 Chen Gang as Zhan A'sheng
 Wang Zhenquan as Quan Jinfa
 He Sirong as Han Xiaoying
 Kong Wei as Mei Chaofeng
 Wang Yunchao as Chen Xuanfeng
 Ba Yin as Temüjin (Genghis Khan)
 Xu Shengnan as Tolui
 Tan Jianchang as Jebe
 Xie Na as Huazheng
 Li Yuan as Jochi
 Yu Jinsheng as Ögedei
 Bai Quanbao as Chagatai
 Yan Hongzhi as Jamukha
 Wang Xiaochen as Feng Heng
 Yang Yi as Ma Yu
 Ji Qilin as Wang Chongyang
 Yang Guang as Wang Chuyi
 Xu Xiaoming as Hao Datong
 Liu Jianwei as Tan Chuduan
 Gong Zhixi as Liu Chuxuan
 Qiu Zi as Sun Bu'er
 Li Jie as Ouyang Ke
 Wang Jianguo as Qiu Qianren / Qiu Qianzhang
 Liu Yiqin as Yinggu
 Yang Yifan as Lu Chengfeng
 Ying Jun as Lu Guanying
 Wang Shasha as Shagu
 Zhang Bojun as Lu Youjiao
 Song Yang as Yin Zhiping
 Zhang Lei as Wanyan Hongxi
 Yu Zikuan as Wanyan Jin (Emperor Zhangzong)
 An Ruiyun as Ala ad-Din Muhammad II
 Lou Yejiang as Xie Bin
 Huang Wei as Jiancheng
 Xue Jian as Weicheng
 He Yan as Si Jiji
 Lu Yong as Duan Tiande
 Xu Ming as Sha Tongtian
 Laopi as Peng Lianhu
 Guo Qiming as Liang Ziweng
 Du Hongjun as Hou Tonghai
 Xiao Bing as Zhang San
 Li Qingxiang as Lingzhi Shangren

Soundtrack
 Yingxiong Mo (英雄寞; Lonesome Heroes) by Ronald Cheng
 Wuyun Ran (乌云然; Dark Clouds) by Hu Ge
 Yingxiong Dao (英雄道; Path of a Hero) by William So 
 Wo Zhineng Aini (我只能爱你; I Can Only Love You) by Peng Qing

Production
Hu Ge was involved in a car accident on 29 August 2006 while travelling from Hengdian to Shanghai on the highway, resulting in the shooting of the series being delayed due to recovery from his injuries.

During the shooting delay due to Hu Ge's recovery from the accident, the filmmakers started a new project The Fairies of Liaozhai (2007) to keep the crew members occupied while waiting to resume work on The Legend of the Condor Heroes.

Sun Xing was originally cast as Hong Qigong but was later replaced by Bryan Leung due to the delay resulting from Hu Ge's recovery, which made Sun decide to move on, causing legal conflict. Sun filmed some scenes prior to his replacement, and those scenes were reshot again later with Leung taking over Sun's role.

Segments from The Young Warriors (2006) were reused for the flashback scene depicting Yang Zaixing's death.

The Song military costumes were originally made for The Young Warriors (2006). The Mongol military costumes were later reused in A Weaver on the Horizon (2010).

Reception
The series was generally well received in China, despite courting some controversy by changing certain portions of the novel for aesthetic purposes to reach modern audiences.

Some antagonists, such as Yang Kang and Wanyan Honglie, also deviate from their counterparts in the novel, to the point that they are portrayed in a more positive light. Other significant deviations from the original story include: greater drama in the rivalry between Guo Jing and Yang Kang; the Yangs' troubled relationship with each other before they acknowledge themselves as family and Yang Kang's desire for vengeance after his parents' deaths; Yang Kang meeting his newborn son and raising the child with Mu Nianci months before his death; Yang Kang's final repentance before letting Ouyang Feng kill him. This resulted in criticism from the audience, who said that the series resembled a Chiung Yao drama where there are often unnecessary and exaggerated conflicts inserted into the storyline.

References

External links
  The Legend of the Condor Heroes on Sina.com
  The Legend of the Condor Heroes on Sohu
  The Legend of the Condor Heroes official page on Chinese Entertainment Shanghai's website
  The Legend of the Condor Heroes on TTV's website

2008 Chinese television series debuts
2008 Chinese television series endings
Television shows based on The Legend of the Condor Heroes
Television series set in the Southern Song
Television series set in the Jin dynasty (1115–1234)
Television series set in the Mongol Empire
Chinese wuxia television series
Television series by Tangren Media
Depictions of Genghis Khan on television
Television shows set in Hangzhou
Mandarin-language television shows